Fourteen ships of the Royal Navy have been named HMS Roebuck after a small deer native to the British Isles:
  was a flyboat purchased in 1585.
  was a 10-gun vessel launched in 1636 and sunk in 1641 as a result of a collision.
  was a 14-gun ship captured in 1646 and commissioned into the Royalist Navy two years later. She was captured at Kinsale in 1649 by Parliamentarian forces and sold in 1651.
  was a 34-gun ship captured in 1653, converted to a hulk in 1664 and sold in 1668.
  was a 16-gun sixth rate launched in 1666 and sold in 1683.
  was a 6-gun fireship purchased in 1688. She was renamed Old Roebuck in 1690 and was deliberately sunk as a foundation in 1696.
  was an 8-gun fireship launched in 1690, and later converted to a 26-gun fifth rate. She sailed under William Dampier to Australia in 1699 and sank in 1701 at Ascension Island on the return voyage.
  was a 42-gun fifth rate launched in 1704 and dismantled in 1725. She was rebuilt in 1722, and sunk in 1743 as a breakwater.
  was a 44-gun fifth rate launched in 1743 and sold in 1764.
  was a 44-gun fifth rate two-decker launched in 1774 and converted to a hospital ship in 1790. In 1799 she was converted to a troopship, and four years later to a guard ship.  She was broken up in 1811.
  was a wooden screw gunvessel launched in 1856 and sold in 1864.
  was a  launched in 1901 and broken up in 1919.
  was an R-class destroyer launched in 1942. She was converted to a frigate in 1953 and was sold in 1968.
  was a survey ship launched in 1985, and was decommissioned in April 2010 and sold to the Bangladesh Navy.

Battle honours
Ships named Roebuck have earned the following battle honours:

Armada, 1588
Cadiz, 1596
Portland, 1653
Gabbard, 1653
Scheveningen, 1653
Barfleur, 1692
Velez Malaga, 1704
Martinique, 1794
Egypt, 1801
China, 1860
Sabang, 1944
Burma, 1944–45
East Indies, 1944−45
Al-Faw, 2003

Sources and references
Sources

References
 

Royal Navy ship names